Kent Yngve Andersson (2 December 1933 – 3 November 2005) was a Swedish actor, theatre director and playwright.

Andersson was born in Gothenburg, Sweden.  He wrote most of his plays from a leftist point of view, criticizing various injustices in society. He was extremely popular in his home town of Gothenburg, but was also widely known among the general Swedish public.  He died in Gothenburg, aged 71.

Filmography

Film

External links 

1933 births
2005 deaths
Actors from Gothenburg
Swedish male actors
Swedish theatre directors
Swedish male dramatists and playwrights
20th-century Swedish dramatists and playwrights
20th-century Swedish male writers